The 2018 Cork Senior Hurling Championship was the 130th staging of the Cork Senior Hurling Championship since its establishment by the Cork County Board in 1887. The draw for the 2018 opening fixtures took place on 10 December 2017. The championship began on 22 March 2018 and ended on 14 October 2018.

Imokilly were the defending champions.

On 14 October 2018, Imokilly won the championship after a 4-19 to 1-18 defeat of Midleton in the final at Páirc Uí Chaoimh. It was their fourth championship title overall and their second title in succession.

Midleton's Conor Lehane was the championship's top scorer with 2-37.

Team changes

To Championship

Promoted from the Cork Premier Intermediate Hurling Championship
 Kanturk

From Championship

Relegated to the Cork Premier Intermediate Hurling Championship
 Youghal

Championship details

Overview

The 2018 championship saw a total of 26 teams compete for the title. These consisted of 18 club teams, 6 divisional teams and 2 college teams. Kanturk made their debut in the senior championship while they were also the first club from the Duhallow Division to play in the senior championship.

Format

A new format was used for the 2018 championship. For the first time since 2015, the divisions and colleges competed in their own mini championship before entering the championship proper.

Divisional and college section

Round 1: Eight teams contested this round. The four winning teams advanced to Round 2. The four losing teams were eliminated from the championship.

Round 2: Four teams contested this round. The two winning teams advanced to Round 3 of the championship proper. The two losing teams were eliminated from the championship.

Club section

Round 1: 18 teams contested this round. The nine losing teams advanced to Round 2. The nine winning teams advanced to Round 3. 

Round 2: The 9 losing teams from Round 1 contested this round. The four winning teams advanced to Round 3. The four losing teams were eliminated from the championship. One team received a bye to Round 3.

Round 3: The 9 winning teams from Round 1, the 4 winning teams from Round 2, the bye team and the 2 divisional teams contested this round.  The 8 winning teams advanced to the Quarter-finals. The 8 losing teams were eliminated from the championship.
 
Quarter-finals: 8 teams contested this round. The 4 winning teams advanced to the Semi-finals. The 4 losing teams were eliminated from the championship.

Semi-finals: 4 teams contested this round. The 2 winning teams advanced to the Semi-finals. The 2 losing teams were eliminated from the championship.

Final: The final was contested by the two semi-final winners.

Results

Divisions/colleges section

Round 1

Round 2

Round 3

Relegation play-offs

Quarter-finals

Semi-finals

Final

Championship statistics

Top scorers

Top scorers overall

Top scorers in a single game

Scoring

Widest winning margin: 20 points
University College Cork 3-20 - 0-09 Avondhu (29 March 2018)
Glen Rovers 4-20 - 1-09 Ballymartle (28 April 2018)
Most goals in a match: 7
Cork Institute of Technology 4-18 - 3-07 Carbery (22 March 2018)

Miscellaneous

 The divisions and colleges section game between Avondhu and Duhallow was the first senior championship match to be played at Kilshannig's home ground, O'Connell Park.
 On 29 April 2018, the double-header of round 1 games at Páirc Uí Rinn were broadcast as part of GAA Beo on TG4. It was the first time that games from the earlier rounds of the championship were broadcast live on national television.
 Kanturk become the first club from the Duhallow division to play in the senior championship.

Team of the Year

The All-Star Team of the Year was announced on 5 December 2018.

External links

 Cork GAA website

References

Cork Senior Hurling Championship
Cork